Dadimal is a small village in Nagar District, Pakistan. It is between Fakar and Miacher.

Populated places in Nagar District